The North Carolina Conference is an Annual Conference (a regional episcopal area, similar to a diocese) of the United Methodist Church. This conference serves the eastern half of the state of North Carolina, with its administrative offices and the office of the bishop located in Garner, North Carolina. It is part of the Southeastern Jurisdictional Conference. The current bishop of the North Carolina Conference is the Reverend Hope Morgan Ward.

The North Carolina Conference provides funding to three institutions of higher learning: 
Methodist University  in Fayetteville, North Carolina
Louisburg College  in Louisburg, North Carolina
North Carolina Wesleyan College  in Rocky Mount, North Carolina.

Districts
The NC Annual Conference is further subdivided into 8 smaller regions, called "districts," which provide further administrative functions for the operation of local churches in cooperation with each other. This structure is vital to Methodism, and is referred to as connectionalism. The Districts that comprise the North Carolina Conference are:
Beacon
Capital
Corridor
Fairway
Gateway
Harbor
Heritage
Sound

Prior to July 2012, the North Carolina Conference had 12 districts.
Burlington 
Durham 
Elizabeth City 
Fayetteville 
Goldsboro 
Greenville
New Bern 
Raleigh  
Rockingham 
Rocky Mount 
Sanford
Wilmington

See also
Annual Conferences of the United Methodist Church

References

External links
North Carolina Conference of The United Methodist Church
Districts of the North Carolina Conference

Methodism in North Carolina
United Methodist churches in North Carolina
United Methodism by region
United Methodist Annual Conferences